Brentside High School is a coeducational foundation secondary school and sixth form in West London, England, located on the border between Hanwell and Greenford in the London Borough of Ealing.

The current school building which opened in September 2004, was purpose built and designed by architects Seymour Harris.

School Expansion Project
The school is currently undergoing an expansion project which was expected to be completed by July/September 2017. The school is expected to open the purpose built Sixth Form building with improved post 16 study facilities including specialist science, PE and ICT rooms. There will also be a fitness suite which students will be able to use. There will also be a much larger sixth form common room/study area.

The House System
Brentside High School's House System encourages and fosters teamwork, participation and sportsmanship in all areas of school life. The sense of community within each of the houses encourages a feeling of identity and belonging. The House System clearly reinforces the ethos and spirit of the school, ‘learning and achieving together’.

All students are allocated to one of four houses: Red, Yellow, Green and Blue.

References

External links
 
 

Secondary schools in the London Borough of Ealing
Foundation schools in the London Borough of Ealing
Hanwell